Kalyaan Dhev Kanuganti is an Indian actor who appears in Telugu films. He made his debut as a lead in the film Vijetha (2018).

Early and personal life 
On 28 March 2016, he married Srija, daughter of Chiranjeevi and became a part of Allu–Konidela family. They have a daughter named Navishka. His father is Captain Kishan, a businessperson.

Career 
Kalyan Dhev made his debut in 2018 with the film Vijetha, alongside Malavika Nair. A critic of Hindustan Times praised Dev's performance and cited "Kalyaan Dhev makes a confident debut with Vijetha." The same year he then signed his second film Super Machi directed by Puli Vasu. After several delays, the film was released theatrically in January 2022, coinciding with the festival of Sankranti. Although his next film Kinnerasani began filming in December 2020, it was released on ZEE5 in June 2022 after several production delays. Dhev plays the role of a lawyer who takes revenge against a serial killer who kills his girlfriend.

In 2021, his next film was started filming. The film is directed by Sreedhar Seepana and also stars Avika Gor.

Filmography

Awards and nominations

References

External links 

 

1990 births
Living people
Male actors in Telugu cinema
Male actors from Hyderabad, India
South Indian International Movie Awards winners
Telugu male actors
Indian male film actors
21st-century Indian male actors